Igor Negrescu (born 17 April 1979) is a Moldavian professional football manager and former footballer. Since June 2013 he is the head coach of Moldavian football club FC Dacia Chişinău.

References

External links
 
 
 

1979 births
Living people
FC Dacia Chișinău managers
FC Dacia Chișinău players
Footballers from Chișinău
Association football defenders
Moldovan football managers
Moldovan footballers
Moldovan Super Liga players
Moldovan Super Liga managers
FC Dinamo-Auto Tiraspol managers